Atrophy is an American thrash metal band formed in Tucson, Arizona. As a result of their fast-playing style and lyrical themes (often covering death, politics and social issues), the band has been compared to their thrash metal contemporaries Testament, Vio-lence, Forbidden, Sacred Reich and Nuclear Assault.

Career
Atrophy, originally named Heresy, was formed in 1986 by Chris Lykins, James Gulotta, and Brian Zimmerman. Tim Kelly and Rick Skowron later joined the band.

In 1987, the band produced two cassette demos and were subsequently picked up by heavy metal label, Roadrunner Records, which released two albums: Socialized Hate in 1988 and Violent by Nature in 1990. These albums saw Atrophy tour the U.S. and Europe, or play selected shows, with the likes of Slayer, Exodus, Suicidal Tendencies, Testament, Sacred Reich, Dark Angel, Forced Entry, Coroner, D.R.I., Flotsam and Jetsam, Death Angel and Venom. Following their 1990 European tour with Sacred Reich and Venom, Lykins left the band to pursue a medical school course, and as a consequence, Atrophy was dropped from Roadrunner. Attempts were made in the early 1990s to continue without Lykins and record a third album; by 1993, however, the band had broken up.

Atrophy reformed in 2015 with a new lineup, including three original members (Zimmerman, Gulotta and Kelly) and two different guitarists as the replacements of Lykins and Skowron (Casper Garret and Rich Olsen, who was later replaced by Bobby Stein). The band's lineup has since changed (with Scott Heller replacing Gulotta on bass), and they are currently working on their third album which will be released on Massacre Records.

Members

Current members
 Brian Zimmerman – vocals
 Casper Garret – guitars
 Bobby Stein – guitars
 Scott Heller – bass
 Tim Kelly – drums

Former members
 Rick Skowron – guitars
 Chris Lykins – guitars
 Jesse Callin – guitars
 Rich Olsen – guitars
 James Gulotta – bass

Discography

Studio albums
 Socialized Hate (1988)
 Violent by Nature (1990)

Demos
 Chemical Dependency demo (1987)
 "Advanced Promo" demo (1987)
 Chemical Dependency demo (2020)

Compilations
 Demolition – Scream Your Brains Out! (1988) – Metal Forces compilation with the songs "Chemical Dependency" and "Preacher, Preacher"
 Stars on Thrash (1988) – Roadrunner Records compilation with the song "Chemical Dependency"

References

Musical groups established in 1986
Musical groups disestablished in 1993
Heavy metal musical groups from Arizona
American thrash metal musical groups
Musical quintets
Musical groups from Tucson, Arizona
1986 establishments in Arizona